Fourcorner Lake is a lake in the municipality of Dysart et al, Haliburton County in Central Ontario, Canada. It is partly within Algonquin Provincial Park and is in the Ottawa River drainage basin. The lake takes its name from its location at a quadripoint, the junction point of four geographic townships: Harburn at northwest, Bruton at the northeast, Harcourt at the southeast, and Dudley at the southwest.

Geography
The nearest named community is Kennaway,  to the east. The portion of the lake in geographic Bruton Township, that is the northeast portion, is the part of the lake that is within Algonquin Provincial Park.

There two unnamed inflows: one at the southwest; and one at the north, arriving from the direction of Weepine Lake. The primary outflow, at the east end of the lake, is Fourcorner Creek. Fourcorner Creek flows via Benoir Lake, the York River and the Madawaska River to the Ottawa River.

References

Lakes of Haliburton County